Ricardo Sperafico (born 23 July 1979) is a Brazilian professional racing driver.

Career
Born in Toledo, he resides in a family of racers, twin brother of Rodrigo, and with two cousins, Alexandre and the late Rafael. He began his career in Europe in Formula Ford. In  1998 and 1999 competed in South American Formula Three and won the Italian Formula 3000 series in 2000, before moving to International F3000 competition the following season.  In 2002, Ricardo, Rodrigo and Alexandre all raced in the series with Ricardo finishing the best, 5th, driving for Petrobras Junior Team.  He finished runner-up in 2003 before taking 2004 off.

In 2005 he competed for the rookie-of-the-year title in Champ Car, driving for Dale Coyne Racing.  He had a difficult time coming to grips with the series, with no less than five different team-mates over the course of the year.  His best finish was 8th in Denver.  Alexandre also contested occasional Champ Car events from 2003 to 2005.

Sperafico returned to Brazil and competed in the Stock Car Brasil from 2007 to 2013, with modest results. Since 2014 he has entered several editions of the Corrida de Duplas. He also drove part-time in 2018.

Racing record

Complete Italian Formula 3000 results
(key) (Races in bold indicate pole position; races in italics indicate fastest lap)

Complete International Formula 3000 results

Complete Champ Car results
(key)

Complete Stock Car Brasil results

External links

1979 births
Living people
People from Toledo, Paraná
Brazilian racing drivers
Formula Ford drivers
Brazilian Champ Car drivers
Auto GP drivers
International Formula 3000 drivers
Stock Car Brasil drivers
Blancpain Endurance Series drivers
Ricardo
Formula 3 Sudamericana drivers
Sportspeople from Paraná (state)
Haywood Racing drivers
Scuderia Coloni drivers
Dale Coyne Racing drivers